Floral Park is a Long Island Rail Road train station in Floral Park, New York, at Tulip and Atlantic Avenues, on the Main Line and Hempstead Branch just west of their split. Most service is provided by Port Jefferson Branch and Hempstead Branch trains.

History
The first Floral Park station was built between October and November 1878 as "Stewart Junction," for the junction between the LIRR Main Line and the Central Railroad of Long Island built by Alexander Turney Stewart. Five years earlier the CRRLI had bridged the LIRR, and the station served as a connection between both lines. Connecting tracks were available at the southwest corner of the bridge at the station, and on the northwest corner of the bridge west of the station. It was renamed "Hinsdale" in 1879 with the closing of the CRRLI depot of the same name along the Creedmoor Branch, then renamed "East Hinsdale" in 1887. That same year, the station gained a control tower known as "Tower #47." Apparently due to the presence of the florist John Lewis Childs, the station was renamed "Floral Park" by 1890. Tower #47 was replaced with the "FK Tower" in 1904, the station itself was razed in 1909, and a second station was rebuilt and relocated the same year in July. In 1924, the LIRR replaced the FK Tower with the Park Tower, and rebuilt it again in 1946. The third and current elevated structure was built in 1960, as the second one was razed on October 20 of that same year.

The ticket office at this station was staffed until August 19, 2009, when it was closed during cost-cutting measures across the MTA.

As part of the LIRR third track project, the Floral Park station was renovated starting in spring 2019 and three vehicular crossings east of the station were rebuilt starting that year. The station was rebuilt and received elevators, making it ADA-accessible as of July 2021.  On August 15, 2022 the track designations at Floral Park were changed.

With the opening of Grand Central Madison, significant service changes occurred at Floral Park. Generally, Hempstead Branch trains provide a one seat ride to Grand Central while Main Line trains provide a one seat ride to Penn Station; previously, almost all Main Line trains bypassed the station. Direct service to Atlantic Terminal is limited to one peak Hempstead Branch train in each direction.

Station layout
This station has three high-level platforms serving four tracks. Platform A is eight cars long, while Platforms B and C are 10 cars long. Main Line trains (the Port Jefferson, Oyster Bay, Ronkonkoma, and Branches) use the three northern tracks while Hempstead Branch trains use the two southern tracks.

References

External links 

 Floral Park Station History (TrainsAreFun)
 Carnation Avenue entrance (west) from Google Maps Street View
 Station House and entrance (middle) from Google Maps Street View
 Tulip Avenue entrance (east) from Google Maps Street View
Platforms from Google Maps Street View
Platform waiting room from Google Maps Street

Long Island Rail Road stations in Nassau County, New York
Long Island Rail Road Station
Railway stations in the United States opened in 1878